The East Jordan Canal is a historic waterway in Salt Lake County, Utah, United States.

Description
The canal is owned by Salt Lake City Public Utilities. The canal exits the Jordan River at Turner Dam, along with the Utah and Salt Lake Canal. An extension of the canal was proposed in 2012, involving a partnership between Salt Lake City Public Utilities and the city of Cottonwood Heights that would result in the construction of a multi-use trail on top of the canal as it passes through an existing urban neighborhood.

References

External links

Canals in Utah
Buildings and structures in Salt Lake County, Utah
Transportation in Salt Lake County, Utah